On 14 February 2001, a vehicular attack took place near Azor, Israel. A Palestinian man from Gaza drove a bus into a group of Israeli soldiers who stood at a bus stop at Azor junction, killing 8 people—7 soldiers and one civilian, and injuring 26 further. The Islamist militant organization Hamas claimed responsibility for the attack.

Attack
The attacker, 35-year old Khalil Abu Alba from Gaza, was a bus driver who used to drive Arab workers in the morning from his city toward Tel Aviv. He had been an Egged bus driver for five years before the attack.

On 14 February, after dropping off as usual the Arab workers at Lod and Ramle, he drove toward Holon. When arriving Azor junction, he noticed a group of Israeli soldiers waiting at a bus stop. The attacker accelerated the bus, and sharply swerved to the right, hitting dozens of people. He killed 8 people, 7 soldiers and one civilian, and injured 26. 

After the attack he accelerated again the bus and drove quickly southwards, in direction of Gaza. The bus was stopped only after crashing into a truck, 30km away, after police officers had shot at the bus' wheels.

References

External links
 The Jewish Agency for Israel website

Terrorist incidents in Israel in 2001
Terrorist incidents involving vehicular attacks
February 2001 events in Asia
Mass murder in 2001
February 2001 crimes
21st-century mass murder in Israel